Porth railway station is a railway station serving the town of Porth in Rhondda Cynon Taf, Wales. It is located on the Rhondda Line.

History
Two stations have served Porth. The first was opened on 4 February 1861 by the Taff Vale Railway; the line had been open since 10 June 1841.

The Rhondda Fawr line to Treherbert  was singled north of here in 1981 and most of the 1876 station buildings were replaced in 1984–85.

The now defunct Maerdy Branch along the Rhondda Fach valley to Maerdy and the collieries at Mardy and Ferndale used to diverge from the 'main line' to  just north of the station at Maerdy Junction. Opened in stages between 1849 and 1856, the passenger service over this route ended in 1964, but mineral traffic to Mardy Colliery continued to run until final closure of the branch in August 1986, when coal from Mardy was then raised from Tower Colliery.  The track was subsequently lifted  in 1996, but the old formation can still be traced (along with the former up loop platform used by branch trains).

An unusual ground level signal box was installed at the station when the Treherbert line was reduced to single track in 1981, replacing a much more substantial TVR structure.  This holds the distinction of the being the last new mechanical box to be built by British Rail, though it had a working life of only 17 years before being abolished in 1998 when the Radyr signalling centre took control of the area.

Services
Monday-Saturday, there is a half-hourly service to  via  and  southbound and to  northbound, serving all stations en route except . This drops to hourly in the late evening. On 20 July 2018, previous franchise operator Arriva Trains Wales announced a trial period of extra Sunday services on the Rhondda Line to Cardiff and Barry Island. This was in response to a survey by Leanne Wood and the success of extra Sunday services on the Merthyr Line and the Rhymney Line.

References

External links 

Railway stations in Rhondda Cynon Taf
DfT Category D stations
Former Taff Vale Railway stations
Railway stations in Great Britain opened in 1861
Railway stations in Great Britain closed in 1876
Railway stations in Great Britain opened in 1876
Railway stations served by Transport for Wales Rail
1861 establishments in Wales